= Huanxi Yuanjia =

Chinese short story collection

Inside chapter one of Huanxi Yuanjia

Huanxi Yuanjia (traditional Chinese: 歡喜冤家; simplified Chinese: 欢喜冤家), (Note: Also known in Chinese as Huanxi Qijuan (traditional Chinese: 歡喜奇觀; simplified Chinese: 欢喜奇观) and several other titles.) also translated into English as Enemies Enamoured, (Note: Or Enamored Enemies.) Enemies in Love, and Lovers and Foes, is a late Ming dynasty Chinese short story collection by a writer under the pseudonym Xihu yuyin zhuren (西湖漁隱主人).

The collection was published in the early 17th-century and features a wide variety of love stories that range from erotic to comical in twenty-four chapters.

Illustrations from a printed edition of Huanxi Yuanjia
